Christopher Allan Whatley, OBE, FRHistS, FRSE, is a well-known and widely published Scottish historian. He has been Professor of Scottish History at the University of Dundee since 1997. He is a prominent opponent of Scottish independence and chaired the inaugural meeting of the local Better Together campaign in Dundee during the 2014 Scottish independence referendum.

Whatley left school at 16 years of age, and worked as a shop assistant and semi-skilled machine operator before attending night classes and taking Highers at Clydebank College in order to obtain a place at the University of Strathclyde. He graduated with a BA in Economic History in 1972, and completed his PhD there in 1975 on the process of industrialisation in Ayrshire. He lectured at Ayr College from 1975 until 1979, when he joined the Department of History at Dundee, where lectured on economic history. Between 1988 and 1992, he taught Scottish History at the University of St Andrews, before returning to Dundee as Bonar Professor of Modern History, and was Head of the Department of History from 1995 until 2002. He was appointed Professor of Scottish History in 1997. He served as Dean of the Faculty of Arts and Social Sciences from 2002 until 2006 and was Vice Principal and Head of the College of Arts and Social Sciences from 2006 until 2014.

He was appointed Officer of the Order of the British Empire (OBE) in the 2015 New Year Honours for services to Scottish history education. He became a Fellow of The Royal Society of Edinburgh in 2003.

His papers are held by Archive Services at the University of Dundee, along with a collection of material relating to the Act of Union that he compiled with Derek Patrick during the writing of The Scots and the Union (published 2006).

References 

Year of birth missing (living people)
Living people
Alumni of the University of Strathclyde
Academics of the University of Dundee
Academics of the University of St Andrews
Fellows of the Royal Society of Edinburgh
Officers of the Order of the British Empire
Fellows of the Royal Historical Society
20th-century Scottish historians
21st-century Scottish historians